The Queensland Nurses and Midwives' Union, officially the Queensland Nurses and Midwives' Union of Employees, (QNMU) is a trade union that represents nurses and midwives in both the public and private sectors of Queensland, Australia. It was formed on 8 November 1921 under the name of the Australasian Trained Nurses' Association (Queensland Branch) Union of Employees. Its current incarnation began in 1982 when the union broke away from the Royal Australian Nursing Federation, now known as the Australian Nursing and Midwifery Federation (ANMF).

Before being known as the Queensland Nurses and Midwives' Union, the union  went under the name of the Queensland Nurses' Union. This was changed in 2017.

Before this the union was known as the Royal Australian Nursing Federation, Queensland Branch, Union of Employees. This royal title was assumed, like other branches of the federation, in 1956 to mark the Queen's visit to Australia.

The QNMU is affiliated with the Queensland Council of Unions, and in the late 1980s signed a "harmonisation" agreement with the then ANF which recognised members of the then QNU as members of the Queensland Branch of the ANF.

In September 2010 the union announced the end of its affiliation with the Australian Labor Party.

Notable people
 Ellen Barron, joint honorary secretary, 1922-1933.
 Florence Chatfield, presided over the founding meeting in 1904; joint honorary secretary, 1922-1933

References

External links
 QNMU website

Trade unions in Queensland
Nursing organisations in Australia
Healthcare trade unions in Australia
Trade unions established in 1921
1921 establishments in Australia